Juuso Pulli (born August 30, 1991) is a Finnish ice hockey defenceman. He is currently playing with Ilves Tampere in the Finnish Liiga.

Pulli made his Liiga debut playing with JYP Jyväskylä during the 2013–14 Liiga season.

References

External links

1991 births
Living people
Finnish ice hockey defencemen
JYP Jyväskylä players
People from Kouvola
Sportspeople from Kymenlaakso